Samuel Brenton (November 22, 1810 – March 29, 1857) was a U.S. Representative from Indiana; born in Gallatin County, Kentucky. Attended the public schools; was ordained to the Methodist ministry in 1830 and served as a minister; located at Danville, Indiana., in 1834 because of ill health, and studied law; member of the Indiana General Assembly in the Indiana House of Representatives (1838–1841); in 1841, returned to the ministry and served at Crawfordsville, Perryville, Lafayette, and finally at Fort Wayne, where he suffered a paralytic stroke in 1848 and was compelled to abandon his ministerial duties; appointed register of the land office at Fort Wayne on May 2, 1849, and served until July 31, 1851, when he resigned; elected as a Whig to the Thirty-second United States Congress (March 4, 1851 – March 4, 1853); unsuccessful candidate for reelection in 1852 to the Thirty-third United States Congress; elected as an Indiana People's Party candidate to the Thirty-fourth United States Congress; elected as a Republican to the Thirty-fifth United States Congress and served from March 4, 1855, until his death in Fort Wayne, Indiana; interment in Lindenwood Cemetery. He was replaced by Charles Case in a special election to finish out his term.

See also
List of United States Congress members who died in office (1790–1899)

References

External links

1810 births
1857 deaths
People from Gallatin County, Kentucky
Whig Party members of the United States House of Representatives from Indiana
Opposition Party members of the United States House of Representatives from Indiana
Republican Party members of the United States House of Representatives from Indiana
Republican Party members of the Indiana House of Representatives
People from Danville, Indiana
19th-century American politicians
American Methodist clergy